Tovmasyan is an Armenian surname. Notable people with the surname include:

Lusine Tovmasyan (born 1986), Armenian beauty pageant contestant
Ruben Tovmasyan (1937–2019), Armenian politician
Taguhi Tovmasyan (born 1982 -) Armenian politician 
Vache Tovmasyan (born 1986), Armenian actor, comedian and showman
Valentin Tovmasyan (1937-2017), Armenian musicologist

Armenian-language surnames